Martin Luther King Jr. Promenade is a  linear park and memorial promenade in San Diego, California, in the United States. Children's Park lies within the promenade. The promenade was dedicated in 1992.

See also

 List of parks in San Diego

References

External links
 

1992 establishments in California
Memorials to Martin Luther King Jr.
Monuments and memorials in California
Parks in San Diego